Cyclic AMP-dependent transcription factor ATF-3 is a protein that, in humans, is encoded by the ATF3 gene.

Function 

Activating transcription factor 3 is a member of the mammalian activation transcription factor/cAMP responsive element-binding (CREB) protein family of transcription factors. Multiple transcript variants encoding two different isoforms have been found for this gene. The longer isoform represses rather than activates transcription from promoters with ATF binding elements. The shorter isoform (deltaZip2) lacks the leucine zipper protein-dimerization motif and does not bind to DNA, and it stimulates transcription, it is presumed, by sequestering inhibitory co-factors away from the promoter. It is possible that alternative splicing of the ATF3 gene may be physiologically important in the regulation of target genes.

Clinical significance 

ATF-3 is induced upon physiological stress in various tissues. It is also a marker of regeneration following injury of dorsal root ganglion neurons, as injured regenerating neurons activate this transcription factor.  Functional validation studies have shown that ATF3 can promote regeneration of peripheral neurons, but is not capable of promoting regeneration of central nervous system neurons.

See also 
 Activating transcription factor

Interactions 
ATF3 has been shown to interact with:
 C-jun, 
 DDIT3 
 JunD, 
 P53, and
 SMAD3.

References

Further reading

External links 
 
 
 

Transcription factors